Pseudometaxis is a genus of leaf beetles in the subfamily Eumolpinae. It is distributed in Southeast Asia and Southern China.

Species
The genus contains at least five species:
 Pseudometaxis minutus Pic, 1923 – China (Yunnan)
 Pseudometaxis rufescens Pic, 1927 – Sumatra
 Pseudometaxis serraticollis (Baly, 1867) – Myanmar, Thailand, Vietnam, Peninsular Malayasia, Sumatra
 Pseudometaxis serratithorax Chen, 1940 – Myanmar
 Pseudometaxis tonkineus Pic, 1924 – Thailand, Vietnam

Synonyms:
 Pseudometaxis hirsutus Pic, 1928: synonym of Pseudometaxis tonkineus Pic, 1924
 Pseudometaxis maculatus Chûjô, 1964: synonym of Pseudometaxis serraticollis (Baly, 1867)
 Pseudometaxis nanus Chen, 1940: synonym of Fidia submaculata (Pic, 1924)
 Pseudometaxis serraticollis Jacoby, 1900 (nec Baly, 1867): renamed to Pseudometaxis serratithorax Chen, 1940
 Pseudometaxis submaculatus (Pic, 1924): moved to Fidia

References

Eumolpinae
Chrysomelidae genera
Taxa named by Martin Jacoby
Beetles of Asia